Immobile may refer to:

 Ciro Immobile (born 1990), Italian footballer
 Immobile (album), a 1998 rock album
 "Immobile" (song), a 2009 pop song

See also

 Immobilization (disambiguation)
 Immobilizer (disambiguation)
 Immobilon
 Mobilities antonym